Baie de Baly National Park is a National Park in Madagascar.

Geography
The Tsingy de Namoroka National Park borders this park. Vegetation consist of dry deciduous forests, scrub-shrub or bamboo shrub, mangroves, lakes and swamps mixed with savanna. Its southern border is formed by the Kapiloza River and the Andranomavo River crosses the park. It is bordered in the north by the Mozambique Channel and in the east by the Bay of Marambitsy.

Flora and fauna
The Baie de Baly National Park is the only known natural habitat of the critically endangered Angonoka tortoise or ploughshare tortoise (Astrochelys yniphora).
Other rare animals found in this park is the Madagascan sideneck turtle (Erymnochelys madagascariensis),  as well as the dugong, a marine mammal and the Madagascar fish eagle. There are also thirteen species of mammals, (six primates), 37 reptile species, eight amphibian species and 122 species of birds. There is also the Perrierbambus madagascariensis, an endemic bamboo. The poisonous tree, Erythrophleum couminga (locally named komanga) is also endemic to this region and can be found in and outside the park. It is a very hard wood but cannot be used for cooking as its fumes contain a poison.

See also
 List of national parks of Madagascar
 Fauna of Madagascar
 Boeny
 Tsingy de Namoroka Strict Nature Reserve

References

1997 establishments in Madagascar
Bays of Madagascar
Boeny
National parks of Madagascar
Protected areas established in 1997
IUCN Category VI
Madagascar dry deciduous forests
Important Bird Areas of Madagascar